In mathematics, a relation on a set  may, or may not, hold between two given set members.
For example, "is less than" is a relation on the set of natural numbers; it holds e.g. between 1 and 3 (denoted as 1<3) , and likewise between 3 and 4 (denoted as 3<4), but neither between 3 and 1 nor between 4 and 4.
As another example, "is sister of" is a relation on the set of all people, it holds e.g. between Marie Curie and Bronisława Dłuska, and likewise vice versa.
Set members may not be in relation "to a certain degree" - either they are in relation or they are not.

The relation "is a nontrivial divisor of" on the set of one-digit natural numbers is  sufficiently small to be shown here:
; for example 2 is a nontrivial divisor of 8, but not vice versa, hence , but .

For most common relations in mathematics, special symbols are introduced, like "<" for "is less than", and "|" for "is a nontrivial divisor of", and, most popular "=" for "is equal to". For example, "1<3", "1 is less than 3", and "" mean all the same; some authors also write "".

Various properties of relations are investigated.
A relation  is reflexive if  holds for all , and irreflexive if  holds for no .
It is symmetric if  always implies , and asymmetric if  implies that  is impossible.
It is transitive if  and  always implies .
For example, "is less than" is irreflexive, asymmetric, and transitive, but neither reflexive nor symmetric,
"is sister of" is transitive, but neither reflexive (e.g. Pierre Curie is not a sister of himself), nor symmetric, nor asymmetric, while being irreflexive or not may be a matter of definition (is every woman a sister of herself?),
"is ancestor of" is transitive, while "is parent of" is not.
Mathematical theorems are known about combinations of relation properties, such as "A transitive relation is irreflexive if, and only if, it is asymmetric".

Of particular importance are relations that satisfy certain combinations of properties.
A partial order is a relation that is reflexive, asymmetric, and transitive,
an equivalence relation is a relation that is reflexive, symmetric, and transitive,
a function is a relation that is right-unique and left-total (see below).

Since relations are sets, they can be manipulated using set operations, including union, intersection, and complementation, and satisfying the laws of an algebra of sets. Beyond that, operations like the converse of a relation and the composition of relations are available, satisfying the laws of a calculus of relations.

The above concept of relation has been generalized to admit relations between members of two different sets (heterogeneous relation, like "lies on" between the set of all points and that of all lines in geometry), relations between three or more sets (Finitary relation, like "person x lives in town y at time z"), and relations between classes (like "is an element of" on the class of all sets, see ).

Definition 

Given a set X, a relation R over X is a set of ordered pairs of elements from X, formally: .

The statement  reads "x is R-related to y" and is written in  infix notation as xRy. The order of the elements is important; if  then yRx can be true or false independently of xRy. For example, 3 divides 9, but 9 does not divide 3.

Representation of relations 

A relation on a finite set may be represented as:
 Hasse diagram
 directed graph
 boolean matrix
 2D-plot
For example, on the set of all divisors of 12, define the relation Rdiv by 
x Rdiv y if x is a divisor of y and x≠y.
Formally, X = { 1, 2, 3, 4, 6, 12 } and Rdiv = { (1,2), (1,3), (1,4), (1,6), (1,12), (2,4), (2,6), (2,12), (3,6), (3,12), (4,12), (6,12) }.
The representation of Rdiv as a boolean matrix is shown in the left table; the representation both as a Hasse diagram and as a directed graph is shown in the right picture.

The following are equivalent:
 x Rdiv y is true.
 (x,y) ∈  Rdiv.
 A path from x to y exists in the Hasse diagram representing Rdiv.
 An edge from x to y exists in the directed graph representing Rdiv.
 In the boolean matrix representing Rdiv, the element in line x, column y is "".

Properties of relations 
Some important properties that a relation  over a set  may have are:

  for all , . For example, ≥ is a reflexive relation but > is not.

  (or ) for all , not . For example, > is an irreflexive relation, but ≥ is not.

The previous 2 alternatives are not exhaustive; e.g., the red binary relation  given in the diagram below is neither irreflexive, nor reflexive, since it contains the pair , but not , respectively.

  for all , if  then .

  for all , if  and  then . For example, ≥ is an antisymmetric relation; so is >, but vacuously (the condition in the definition is always false).

  for all , if  then not . A relation is asymmetric if and only if it is both antisymmetric and irreflexive. For example, > is an asymmetric relation, but ≥ is not.

  for all , if  and  then . A transitive relation is irreflexive if and only if it is asymmetric. For example, "is ancestor of" is a transitive relation, while "is parent of" is not.

For example, on the natural numbers, < is connected, while "is a divisor of" is not (e.g. neither 5R7 nor 7R5).

For example, on the natural numbers, ≤ is strongly connected, but < is not. A relation is strongly connected if, and only if, it is connected and reflexive.

Uniqueness properties:
 Injective (also called left-unique) For all , if  and  then . For example, the green and blue binary relations in the diagram are injective, but the red one is not (as it relates both −1 and 1 to 1), nor is the black one (as it relates both −1 and 1 to 0).
 Functional (also called right-unique, right-definite or univalent)For all , if  and  then . For example, the red and green binary relations in the diagram are functional, but the blue one is not (as it relates 1 to both −1 and 1), nor is the black one (as it relates 0 to both −1 and 1).

Totality properties:

  (also called  or ) For all , there exists some  such that . Such a relation is called a multivalued function. For example, the red and green binary relations in the diagram are total, but the blue one is not (as it does not relate −1 to any real number), nor is the black one (as it does not relate 2 to any real number). As another example, > is a serial relation over the integers. But it is not a serial relation over the positive integers, because there is no  in the positive integers such that . However, < is a serial relation over the positive integers, the rational numbers and the real numbers. Every reflexive relation is serial: for a given , choose .

 Surjective (also called right-total or onto) For all y in X, there exists an x in X such that xRy. For example, the green and blue binary relations in the diagram are surjective, but the red one is not (as it does not relate any real number to −1), nor is the black one (as it does not relate any real number to 2).

Combinations of properties 

 {| class="wikitable mw-collapsible" style="text-align:center;float:right;"
|+ align="top" | Relations by property
|-
!
! 
! 
! 
! 
! 
|-
! Partial order
| 
| 
| 
|
| Subset
|-
! Strict partial order
| 
| 
| 
|
| Strict subset
|-
! Total order
| 
| 
| 
| 
| Alphabetical order
|-
! Strict total order
| 
| 
| 
| 
| Strict alphabetical order
|-
! Equivalence relation
| 
| 
| 
|
| Equality
|}

Relations that satisfy certain combinations of the above properties are particularly useful, and thus have received names by their own.

  A relation that is reflexive, symmetric, and transitive. It is also a relation that is symmetric, transitive, and serial, since these properties imply reflexivity.

Orderings:

  A relation that is reflexive, antisymmetric, and transitive.

  A relation that is irreflexive, antisymmetric, and transitive.

  A relation that is reflexive, antisymmetric, transitive and connected.

  A relation that is irreflexive, antisymmetric, transitive and connected.

Uniqueness properties:

 One-to-one Injective and functional. For example, the green binary relation in the diagram is one-to-one, but the red, blue and black ones are not.
 One-to-many Injective and not functional. For example, the blue binary relation in the diagram is one-to-many, but the red, green and black ones are not.
 Many-to-one Functional and not injective. For example, the red binary relation in the diagram is many-to-one, but the green, blue and black ones are not.
 Many-to-many Not injective nor functional. For example, the black binary relation in the diagram is many-to-many, but the red, green and blue ones are not.

Uniqueness and totality properties:
 A  A binary relation that is functional and total. For example, the red and green binary relations in the diagram are functions, but the blue and black ones are not.
 An  A function that is injective. For example, the green binary relation in the diagram is an injection, but the red, blue and black ones are not.
 A  A function that is surjective. For example, the green binary relation in the diagram is a surjection, but the red, blue and black ones are not.
 A  A function that is injective and surjective. For example, the green binary relation in the diagram is a bijection, but the red, blue and black ones are not.

Operations on relations 

For example, ≤ is the union of < and =, and ≥ is the union of > and =.

For example, "is a lower card of the same suit as" is the intersection of "is a lower card than" and "belongs to the same suit as".

The order of R and S in the notation , used here agrees with the standard notational order for composition of functions. For example, the composition "is mother of" ∘ "is parent of" yields "is maternal grandparent of", while the composition "is parent of" ∘ "is mother of" yields "is grandmother of". For the former case, if x is the parent of y and y is the mother of z, then x is the maternal grandparent of z.

  If R is a binary relation over sets X and Y then RT = {(y, x) | xRy} is the converse relation of R over Y and X. For example, = is the converse of itself, as is ≠, and < and > are each other's converse, as are ≤ and ≥. A binary relation is equal to its converse if and only if it is symmetric.

The complement of the converse relation  is the converse of the complement: 

However, the transitive closure of a restriction is a subset of the restriction of the transitive closure, i.e., in general not equal. For example, restricting the relation "x is parent of y" to females yields the relation "x is mother of the woman y"; its transitive closure doesn't relate a woman with her paternal grandmother. On the other hand, the transitive closure of "is parent of" is "is ancestor of"; its restriction to females does relate a woman with her paternal grandmother.

A binary relation R over sets X and Y is said to be  a relation S over X and Y, written  if R is a subset of S, that is, for all  and  if xRy, then xSy. If R is contained in S and S is contained in R, then R and S are called equal written R = S. If R is contained in S but S is not contained in R, then R is said to be  than S, written . For example, on the rational numbers, the relation > is smaller than ≥, and equal to the composition

Examples 
 Order relations, including strict orders:
 Greater than
 Greater than or equal to
 Less than
 Less than or equal to
 Divides (evenly)
 Subset of
 Equivalence relations:
 Equality
 Parallel with (for affine spaces)
 Is in bijection with
 Isomorphic
 Tolerance relation, a reflexive and symmetric relation:
 Dependency relation, a finite tolerance relation
 Independency relation, the complement of some dependency relation
 Kinship relations

Generalizations 

The above concept of relation has been generalized to admit relations between members of two different sets.
When , the relation concept described above is obtained; it is often called homogeneous relation (or endorelation) to distinguish it from its generalization.
The above properties and operations that are marked "" and "", respectively, generalize to heterogeneous relations.
An example of a heterogeneous relation is "ocean x borders continent y".
The best-known examples are functions with distinct domains and ranges, such as

See also 

 Incidence structure, a heterogeneous relation between set of points and lines
 Order theory, investigates properties of order relations

Notes

References

Bibliography